Seraina Friedli (born 20 March 1993) is a Swiss footballer who plays as a goalkeeper for Italian Serie A club Florentia San Gimignano SSD and the Switzerland women's national team.

Career

Club
Friedli played for Swiss club FC Zürich in the Nationalliga A from  2012 to 2018. With the club, she won four national titles and three national cups. With FC Zürich, Friedli also has played six consecutive editions of the UEFA Champions League, and a match against FC Zürich U15 boys.

International
Friedli has been called for the Switzerland National Team since 2016. On July 3, 2017, Friedli was called by coach Martina Voss-Tecklenburg to represent Switzerland at the UEFA Women's Euro 2017, but she didn't play any matches as Switzerland was eliminated still in the tournament's group stage.

References

External links
 
 
 

1993 births
Living people
Switzerland women's international footballers
Swiss women's footballers
Women's association football goalkeepers
FC Zürich Frauen players
Florentia San Gimignano S.S.D. players
Serie A (women's football) players
Swiss Women's Super League players
BSC YB Frauen players
Swiss expatriate sportspeople in Italy
Expatriate women's footballers in Italy
UEFA Women's Euro 2022 players
UEFA Women's Euro 2017 players
People from Maloja District
Swiss expatriate women's footballers